

Tournaments

Men's tournaments

Olympics
1936 Olympics at Berlin

Amateur
 AAU
Globe Refiners (McPherson, KS) 47, Universal Pictures (Hollywood, CA) 35

Births
August 21 — Wilt Chamberlain, Hall of Fame center (died 1999)